Christopher Gonzalez, also known as NYChrisG, is an American competitive gamer, specializing in fighting games. He is considered one of the top Ultimate Marvel vs. Capcom 3 players. He is also the EVO 2016 champion for Ultimate Marvel vs. Capcom 3.

Career

2011
Gonzalez was first sponsored by the Local Battles Gaming Center in Fort Lee, New Jersey. Gonzalez first came to prominence at CEO 2011 and got 3rd place in Marvel vs. Capcom 3, losing only to Justin Wong and Hajime "Tokido" Taniguchi. Gonzalez would later attend EVO 2011 and defeat Noah Solis using a team of Amaterasu, Ryu, and Albert Wesker. Gonzalez also placed Top 8 in Mortal Kombat during that event, getting 4th place using Reptile. He was knocked into losers by Eric "JOP" Akins, and then eliminated by Giuseppe "REO" Grosso. Gonzalez also represented the East Coast in the East Coast vs. West Coast Marvel vs. Capcom 3 exhibition in which his team lost.

2012
Gonzalez made a name for himself in Ultimate Marvel vs. Capcom 3 by using a team consisting of Morrigan, Doctor Doom, and Akuma. In March 2012, Gonzalez left Local Battles and joined FingerCramp. At EVO 2012, Gonzalez successfully made the Top 8, where he successfully defeated Justin Wong, Job "Flocker" Figueroa, and Peter "Combofiend" Rosas. He was ultimately defeated by Ryan "Filipino Champ" Ramirez, finishing 3rd. Gonzalez would later go on to substitute Akuma for Vergil on his main team. In October, Gonzalez left FingerCramp and joined AfterGlow Elite.

2013
Gonzalez attended CEO 2013 and won the Injustice: Gods Among Us and UMvC3 tournaments. Gonzalez made Top 8 in Injustice: Gods Among Us and Ultimate Marvel vs. Capcom 3 at Evolution 2013. Gonzalez received 3rd place in Injustice: Gods Among Us using Green Arrow. He was defeated by Denzell "Crazy DJT 88" Terry twice, once in the Winners Bracket and once in the Losers Bracket. Gonzalez also lost to Justin Wong in the Ultimate Marvel vs. Capcom 3 tournament, finishing tied for 5th. Gonzalez later attended Capcom Cup, qualifying for the Super Street Fighter IV: Arcade Edition v2012 tournament and being voted into the Ultimate Marvel vs. Capcom 3 tournament. Gonzalez defeated Michael "IFC Yipes" Mendoza in the Grand Finals in order to receive the trophy. Gonzalez would later defeat EVO 2013 champion Job "Flocker" Figueroa in a first-to-5 exhibition. Gonzalez got 7th place in the Street Fighter tournament, being knocked into losers by Naoto "Sakonoko" Sako and then being eliminated by Hajime "Tokido" Taniguchi.

2014
Gonzalez was released from AfterGlow Elite as it was disbanded. Gonzalez moved from his hometown of New York City to Los Angeles, California. There he was sponsored by GamesterGear for Final Round XVII. Gonzalez would permanently be part of the team later on. Gonzalez plans to continue using Sakura in Ultra Street Fighter IV, and will be using Yang, Evil Ryu, and Elena as alternates. Gonzalez attended CEO 2014 and won the Ultimate Marvel vs. Capcom 3 Tournament, although he was unable to defend his title in Injustice: Gods Among Us being defeated by ForeverKing and DEG. Gonzalez has competed at EVO 2014, most notably receiving 2nd place in Ultimate Marvel vs. Capcom 3, losing to six-time Marvel vs. Capcom 2 champion Justin Wong. Also notable was Gonzalez failing to make the Top 8 for Injustice: Gods Among Us receiving 13th place. In late October, Gonzalez announced his departure from GamesterGear. After not showing up at a major tournament in three months, Gonzalez made a return to the scene by entering NEC 15, placing Top 8 in Ultimate Marvel vs. Capcom 3, Mortal Kombat (2011), and Ultra Street Fighter IV. Also notable at the tournament was Gonzalez receiving first place in the Ultimate Marvel vs. Capcom 3 based tournament Curleh Mustache Battle Royale 4 which took place at the same time as NEC 15.

2015
On March 10, Gonzalez was picked up by Tempo Storm as their first player in their Fighting Games division. On April 2, it was revealed that Gonzalez would be featured on Cross Counter's hit show "The Excellent Adventures of Gootecks and Mike Ross" for four episodes. In June, fellow Ultimate Marvel vs. Capcom 3 god Justin Wong placed a $300 bounty on Gonzalez, Wong himself, and Ryan "Filipino Champ" Ramirez for eliminating them in the Ultimate Marvel vs. Capcom 3 tournament at EVO 2015. Gonzalez earned $300 for eliminating fellow god Justin Wong from said tournament, but was eliminated by Japanese player Ryota "RF" Fukumoto in a mirror match to get into Top 8.

2016
On March 2, Gonzalez was released from Tempo Storm as his contract expired. At EVO 2016, Gonzalez won the Ultimate Marvel vs. Capcom 3 tournament out of the Loser's Bracket with an impressive showcasing of how deadly his team's synergy of MorriDoom and anchor Vergil can be.

Gonzalez has picked up Street Fighter V and mainly plays Guile in said game. Prior to Guile being released in late April he played Cammy and Nash.

2017
On January 1, 2017, Gonzalez was signed by Evil Geniuses.

2020
On June 23, 2020, Gonzalez was released by Evil Geniuses for comments he made on Facebook in 2017.

Notable tournament placings

References and notes

External links
 NYChrisG's Player Profile - Shoryuken Rankings

1990 births
Living people
Sportspeople from New York City
American esports players
Fighting game players
Tempo Storm players
Evil Geniuses players
Marvel vs. Capcom players
Street Fighter players
Mortal Kombat players